Geneston is a commune in the Loire-Atlantique department in western France.

Population

Personalities
 Philibert Delorme (1510–1570), architect
 Rogatien Martin (1849–1912), monk in the Marquesas Islands.
 Jean-Baptiste Legeay (1897–1943), active in the Resistance during World War II

See also
Communes of the Loire-Atlantique department

References

Communes of Loire-Atlantique